Sex and drugs date back to ancient humans and have been interlocked throughout human history. Both legal and illegal, the consumption of drugs and their effects on the human body encompasses all aspects of sex, including desire, performance, pleasure, conception, gestation, and disease.

There are many different types of drugs that are commonly associated with their effects on sex, including alcohol, cannabis, cocaine, MDMA, GHB, amphetamines, opioids, antidepressants, and many others.

Disinhibition 
Drugs are frequently associated with reduced sexual inhibition, both when used voluntarily in social circumstances, and involuntarily, as in the case of some date rape drugs. Because the use of drugs, including alcohol, is commonly presented as an excuse for risky or socially unacceptable behavior, it is necessary to treat the idea of a direct causal relation between drug use and unsafe sex with caution.  Drugs may provide a socially acceptable excuse for engaging in sexual behaviors in which people may want to engage but perhaps feel that they should not.

Sexual function 
Some forms of sexual dysfunction such as erectile dysfunction can be treated with drugs. Because of their effects, erectile dysfunction drugs are sometimes used for recreational purposes. Many drugs, both legal and illegal, some sold online, have side effects that affect the user's sexual function. Many drugs can cause loss of libido as a side effect.

Since a partial cause of the refractory period is the inhibition of dopamine by an orgasm-induced secretion of prolactin, such potent dopamine receptor agonists as cabergoline may help achieve multiple orgasms as well as the retention of sexual arousal for longer periods of time.

Sexual activity, drug use, and risks 
According to some studies, up to 22.1% of teenagers abused substances during their most recent sexual experience.

Likewise, studies have shown adolescents who regularly abuse substances are more likely to initiate sexual activity at an earlier age, have a more significant number of sexual partners, and engage in unprotected sex more often.

Additionally, substance abuse has been linked to an increased risk of Sexually transmitted infection (STI).

Types of drugs and effects

Cannabis 
Cannabis is the most commonly used illicit substance. Studies on Cannabis and sex have shown that THC has been linked to improved sexual desire and function. Specifically, in one study, 70 percent of users said marijuana was an aphrodisiac, and 81 percent said it improved their sexual pleasure and satisfaction.

Other research has found that long-term marijuana use lowers testosterone levels and other reproductive hormones, causing erectile dysfunction in males.

Alcohol 
Alcohol inhibits neuronal excitability through acting on gamma-aminobutyric acid (GABA) receptors. Alcohol is often accessible in a number of social situations across many cultures and is frequently connected with uninhibited social activities. Alcohol has been shown in human research to have surprising effects on the human libido.

While some studies indicates that alcohol improves sexual behavior and desire, other research indicates that alcohol impairs sexual function.

The conditions under which the drinking occurs, laboratory research vs self-report studies from users, as well as the amounts of alcohol consumed, may all contribute to these controversial outcomes.

Laboratory studies have demonstrated that while low blood alcohol levels have no effect on or slightly enhance sexual arousal and responsiveness in men, elevated blood alcohol levels result in decreased erectile responsiveness, decreased arousal, and impaired ability to ejaculate. Other laboratory research, on the other hand, found no significant influence of either low or high blood alcohol levels on measures of arousal.

Even with mild alcohol use, women have decreased vaginal flow responses. In apparent contrast, women self-report heightened sexual desire and pleasure when they consume more alcohol and are more likely to engage in sexual activities with someone when intoxicated.

Heavy alcohol intake impairs sexual and reproductive function, erectile, and ejaculatory dysfunction in males, and sexual arousal, interest, and orgasm in women.

Alcohol and sex although alcohol may have varying impacts on sexual performance depending on the amount drank, it generally impairs sexual functioning and contributes to increased sexual risk taking.

Cocaine 
Cocaine is a potent psycho-stimulant that boosts dopamine levels by inhibiting dopamine transporters. It has been often linked to enhanced libido and risk-taking behavior in humans.

Cocaine has been observed to increase sexual arousal or to trigger spontaneous erections and orgasms.

In contrast, other data has shown that persistent cocaine use impairs sexual desire and the capacity of both men and females to achieve orgasm.

MDMA 
MDMA or "ecstasy" originally gained popularity in the 1980s among college students. According to a survey conducted, 10% of college students at a big US institution reported using MDMA, with alcohol and marijuana being the most often used substances. MDMA users report increased enjoyment in physical contact and proximity rather than a sexual experience. MDMA has been shown to impair sexual performance, including erectile dysfunction and delayed orgasm, as well as to suppress sex desire.

2C-B 
2C-B was first sold commercially in 5 mg pills as a purported aphrodisiac under the trade name "Erox", which was manufactured by the German pharmaceutical company Drittewelle. While being primarily a psychedelic it is also a mild entactogen. 5-MeO-MiPT is another psychedelic that some users find to be euphoric and tactile in low to moderate doses of 4-8 milligrams.

Antidepressants 
Psychiatrists and doctors commonly prescribe different types of antidepressants to patients. SSRIs, SNRIs, and NDRIs are the most common types of antidepressants. Each has slightly different effects on sexual functioning, but generally, it has been found that antidepressants can delay/decrease orgasms and cause females to have breast enlargement. Dapoxetine in particular takes advantage of the side effect of delayed orgasm and is approved specifically as a medication for the treatment of premature ejaculation rather than as an antidepressant.

The side effects on sexual functioning can impact mental health and quality of life. However, the decrease in depressive symptoms from antidepressants make it worth the sexual side effects for many people. They can be managed by changing the dose, switching drugs, or taking “antidotes”. Maca, a plant that grows in central Peru, aids with sexual dysfunction caused by antidepressant drugs for women. There are specific Maca products that can also increase sexual desire in men.

Opioids 
Opioids (also known as narcotics) such as morphine and heroin attach to opioid receptors in the brain. These substances have long been known to inhibit sexual behavior.

Similar to the effects of psycho-stimulants, both men and women who use heroin report engaging in high-risk sexual practices.

Subjects typically report having several sexual partners, using condoms seldom or not at all, and having a high frequency of STI diagnosis.

While small doses of heroin may enhance sexual desire and performance, chronic opiate use, including methadone and buprenorphine, synthetic and semi-synthetic opiates prescribed for opiate addiction treatment, results in decreased sexual desire, response, and orgasms for both men and women, as well as erectile, ejaculatory dysfunction, and vaginismus.

Amphetamines 
Amphetamines may lead to an increase in sexual drive and delay in orgasm.

Date rape drugs
A date rape drug is any drug that is an incapacitating agent which—when administered to another person—incapacitates the person and renders them vulnerable to a drug-facilitated sexual assault (DFSA), including rape. One of the most common types of DFSA are those in which a victim consumes a recreational drug such as alcohol that was administered surreptitiously. The other most common form of DFSA involves the non-surreptitiously-administered consumption of alcohol. Here, the victims in these cases are drinking voluntarily which then makes them unable to make informed decisions or give consent.

Society and culture

Chemsex
Party and play, or chemsex, is the consumption of drugs to facilitate sexual activity. Sociologically, both terms refer to a subculture of recreational drug users who engage in high-risk sexual activities under the influence of drugs within groups. The term PnP is commonly used by gay men and other men who have sex with men (MSM) in North America, while chemsex is more associated with the gay scene in Europe. The drug of choice is typically methamphetamine, known as tina or T, but other drugs are also used, such as mephedrone, GHB, GBL and alkyl nitrites (known as poppers).

Contraception and abortion 
Drug-based contraception has been available since the development of the contraceptive pill. As well as their contraceptive effects, contraceptive drugs can also have adverse sexual and reproductive side-effects. Prior to the availability of effective contraceptives, some substances were also used as abortifacients to terminate pregnancy; medical abortion exists as a modern medical practice.

See also 

 Abortifacient
 Aphrodisiac
 Date rape drug
 Hormonal contraception
 
 Methamphetamine and sex
 Nitrite inhalants
 Party and play
 Sex and alcohol
 Wine, women, and song

References 

 
Pharmacology
Drug culture
Sexology
Drugs